Comondú is a municipality of the Mexican state of Baja California Sur. It had a population of 70,816 inhabitants in 2010 census (INEGI). With a land area of 16,858.3 km2 (6,509.03 sq mi), it is the seventh-largest municipality in area in Mexico. The municipal seat is located in Ciudad Constitución.

The Spanish missions of San José de Comondú and San Luis Gonzaga are located in this municipality. Rocas Alijos, a group of tiny rocks that are 300 km west off the coast, are part of the municipality.

Politics

The Municipality of Comondú was one of the first three municipalities created in the then Federal South Territory of Baja California as part of a presidential decree of 1971, after a constitutional amendment allowing the creation and election of local councils in the territory, hitherto divided into political delegations. Dated January 1, 1972 Comondú was formally the first City Council. The township government rests with the council; it consists of the Mayor, a trustee and a council composed of fourteen aldermen; the city council is elected for a period of three years by popular vote (direct and secret), starting every April 30 of the election year.

As of March 1, 2021, the municipality reported 1,740 recoveries, 26 active cases, and 158 deaths from the COVID-19 pandemic in Mexico.

Demographics

As of 2010, the municipality had a total population of 70,816.

The municipality had 1,516 localities, the largest of which (with 2010 populations in parentheses) were: Ciudad Constitución (40,935), Ciudad Insurgentes (8,741), Puerto San Carlos (5,538), classified as urban, and Puerto Adolfo López Mateos (2,212), Villa Ignacio Zaragoza (1,266), and Villa Morelos (1,153), classified as rural.

References

External links

The largest and smallest municipalities in area Instituto Nacional para el Federalismo y el Desarrollo Municipal (INAFED)

 
Municipalities of Baja California Sur